Major General Gilbert Savil Szlumper,  (18 April 1884 – 19 July 1969) was a British railwayman, and the penultimate general manager of the Southern Railway. He left the Southern Railway for war service in 1939, becoming director-general of transportation & movements, War Office (1939–1940); railway control officer, Ministry of Transport (1940–1941) and director-general of supply services, Ministry of Supply (1942–1945).

Early life
Gilbert Szlumper was the son of Alfred W. Szlumper, chief engineer of the London and South Western Railway (LSWR). He was educated at King's College School, Wimbledon, and studied engineering for two years at King's College, London. He joined the LSWR in 1904, held a commission in the Royal Engineers from 1908, became personal assistant to the LSWR General Manager in February 1914 and was secretary to the Railway Executive Committee during the First World War. Szlumper was trained as a civil engineer, becoming docks and marine manager at Southampton, before becoming assistant general manager of the Southern Railway.

Southern Railway
Szlumper became assistant general manager of the Southern Railway in 1925, and was appointed general manager of the Southern Railway upon Sir Herbert Walker's retirement in 1937. In 1939, Szlumper left the Southern Railway for war service. He surrendered the post of general manager of the Southern Railway to Sir Eustace Missenden, who had refused to take up position as acting general manager in anticipation of Szlumper's return in peacetime.

References

1884 births
1969 deaths
London and South Western Railway people
Southern Railway (UK) people
British railway civil engineers
People educated at King's College School, London
Alumni of King's College London
Commanders of the Order of the British Empire